Razvi is the surname of the following people

Acen Razvi, English breakbeat music producer
Asif Iqbal Razvi (born 1943), Pakistani cricketer
Kasim Razvi (1902–1970), Indian politician
Murtaza Razvi (1964–2012), Pakistani journalist

See also
Razvily, Russian locality in Perm Krai